The Surigaonon people are an ethnolinguistic group who inhabited on the eastern coastal plain of Mindanao, particularly the provinces of Surigao del Norte, Surigao del Sur and Dinagat Islands. They are also present in the provinces of Agusan del Norte, Agusan del Sur, and in Davao Oriental. They are part of the Bisaya people, who constitute the largest Filipino ethnolinguistic group in the country.

History 
Rajah Siawi and Rajah Kulambo, members of the nobility of the Surigaonon and Butuanon people, respectively, were encountered by the Magellan expedition in 1521 on the island of Limasawa (which was a hunting ground for the rulers). Antonio Pigafetta describes them as being tattooed and covered in gold ornaments. Pigafetta also records the name of the Surigao region as "Calagan".

Demographics
Currently, the Surigaonons number about 1,000,000 (estimates) based on the population of Surigao del Norte, Surigao del Sur and some speakers of Agusan del Norte.

Surigaonons are Austronesians, like almost all native Filipino ethnic groups. They are part of the wider Visayan ethnic group. Their language closely resembles Cebuano, albeit with some local words and phrases. Hence, it is considered by most linguists to be a separate language, the Surigaonon language. Because of the mass influx of Cebuano settlers to Mindanao, they also speak Cebuano as second language since Surigaonon is a Visayan language, other languages are Tagalog, and English as third languages. The vast majority of Surigaonons are Roman Catholics, very few are Muslims in contrast to its very closely related Tausug brothers which are predominantly Muslims.

Language 
Below is a table which demonstrates that Surigaonon is more related to Tausug than Cebuano:

Culture
The Surigaonons, like the closely-related Butuanon people, are part of the larger Visayan group and have a culture similar to the Cebuanos. Pre-Hispanic Surigaonons are very fond of ornamental designs and displays. Most Surigaonons are agriculturalists.

See also
Surigaonon language

Caraga

 Surigao del Norte
 Surigao del Sur

Ethnic groups in the Philippines

Bisaya peoples
Butuanon people
Cebuano people
Tausūg people

References

Ethnic groups in Mindanao